Bredsand (or Ryssbo) is a locality situated in Enköping Municipality, Uppsala County, Sweden with 465 inhabitants in 2010.

References 

Populated places in Uppsala County
Populated places in Enköping Municipality